The 1994 Rose Bowl was a college football bowl game played on January 1, 1994. It was the 80th Rose Bowl Game. The Wisconsin Badgers defeated the UCLA Bruins 21–16. Running back Brent Moss of Wisconsin was named the Rose Bowl Player of the Game.

Pre-game activities
On Tuesday, October 19, 1993, Tournament of Roses Interim President Michael E. Ward selected 18-year-old Erica Beth Brynes, a senior at Arcadia High School and a resident of Arcadia, as the 76th Rose Queen, to reign over the 105th Rose Parade and the 80th Rose Bowl Game.

The game was presided over by the 1994 Tournament of Roses Royal Court and Rose Parade Grand Marshal William Shatner. The Royal Court was led by Queen Erica and consisted of six rose princesses: Nicole Bangar, South Pasadena; Therese Erdman, Arcadia; Shannon Hall, San Marino; Sabrina Prud'homme, Altadena; Shannon Sheldon, San Marino; and Jennifer Trayner, San Marino.

Before the game, Chris Farley gave Wisconsin’s “motivational speech” playing his popular Saturday Night Live character, Matt Foley.

Teams

Wisconsin Badgers

In the final game of the season, Wisconsin defeated Michigan State in the last Coca-Cola Classic to secure a conference co-championship.  The Badgers' sole loss was to Minnesota by a score of 21–28 in their annual rivalry game.

Ohio State lost to Michigan, 28–0, in their annual rivalry game.  Wisconsin and Ohio State ended the season with identical 9–1–1 records with 6–1–1 conference records, and tied when they met during the season in a game at Camp Randall (college football would not adopt "overtime" to resolve ties in regulation until the 1996 season).  Wisconsin and Ohio State were co-champions of the Big Ten Conference.  Wisconsin won the Rose Bowl invitation tiebreaker due to Big Ten rules which resolved first-place ties by eliminating the most recent invitee: Wisconsin had last been to the Rose Bowl in 1963, while Ohio State was in the 1985 Rose Bowl.

UCLA Bruins

UCLA opened the season with two close losses: 25–27 against California, and 13–14 against Nebraska. The Bruins then won seven in a row, including a win over #7 Arizona. They lost 3–9 against Arizona State. The 1993 UCLA–USC rivalry game had the Pac-10 championship and the Rose Bowl berth on the line for both the Bruins and the Trojans. UCLA won 27–21 at the Coliseum. Arizona was tied for first, but did not receive the Rose Bowl invitation because of the head-to-head loss at UCLA. This was coach Terry Donahue's last Rose Bowl appearance.

Game summary
The weather was 73 degrees and hazy. UCLA receiver J. J. Stokes set Rose Bowl records for receptions (14) and receiving yards (176).  Brent Moss gashed the UCLA defense for 158 rushing yards and 2 touchdowns.

Scoring

First quarter
UCLA — Bjorn Merten, 27-yard field goal. 
Wisconsin — Brent Moss three-yard run. Rick Schnetzky converts.

Second quarter
Wisconsin — Moss, one-yard run. Schnetzky converts.

Third quarter
No Scoring

Fourth quarter
UCLA — Ricky Davis 12-yard run. Merten converts. 
Wisconsin — Darrell Bevell 21-yard run. Schnetzky converts. 
UCLA — Mike Nguyen, five-yard pass from Wayne Cook. 2-point conversion Pass failed.

Statistics

Notes
 UCLA offensive tackle Jonathan Ogden went on to play for the Baltimore Ravens and was inducted into the College Football Hall of Fame and the Pro Football Hall of Fame.

References

Bibliography

External links
 Summary at ESPN.com

Rose Bowl
Rose Bowl Game
UCLA Bruins football bowl games
Wisconsin Badgers football bowl games
Rose Bowl
January 1994 sports events in the United States